Dan Torsten Sehlberg is a Swedish thriller author and entrepreneur.

New Regency has bought the film rights to Sehlberg novel Mona with Michelle Kroes and David Manpearl overseeing the project. There is also a sequel to Mona entitled Sinon.

Michael London has been assigned by Studio New Regency to produce the movie.

Dan Sehlberg founded a real-estate company in 2009.

References

Living people
Swedish male writers
Year of birth missing (living people)